Edward Stradling (30 March 1699 – 3 October 1726) was a Welsh politician.

The oldest son of Sir Edward Stradling, 5th Baronet (1672–1735), he was educated at Christ Church, Oxford. In 1722, he was elected to the House of Commons of Great Britain as the Member of Parliament (MP) for Cardiff Boroughs, succeeding his father. He died in office in 1726, aged 27.

References 
 

1699 births
1726 deaths
Alumni of Christ Church, Oxford
Members of the Parliament of Great Britain for Welsh constituencies
British MPs 1722–1727
Heirs apparent who never acceded